Ray Chen (born 1989) is a Taiwanese-Australian violinist.

Ray Chen or Raymond Chen may also refer to:

 Raymond T. Chen (born 1968), United States judge
 Ray Chen (engineer), American engineer

See also
 Ray Chan (disambiguation)
 Raymond Chang (disambiguation)